is a Japanese professional baseball player. He was born on January 6, 1988. He debuted in 2013 with the Hokkaido Nippon-Ham Fighters. He had 3 strikeouts.

References

Living people
1988 births
People from Tokyo
Japanese baseball players
Nippon Professional Baseball pitchers
Hokkaido Nippon-Ham Fighters players